Salimu is a village on the island of Upolu in Samoa. It is situated on the north east coast of the island and is one of the main centres of the political district of Va'a-o-Fonoti.

The population is 65.

References

Populated places in Va'a-o-Fonoti